Wolfram Ortner (born 10 March 1960) is an Austrian former alpine skier who was 4th at the 1982 World Chanpionships in combined.

World Cup results
Top 5

References

External links
 

1960 births
Living people
Austrian male alpine skiers
People from Spittal an der Drau District
Sportspeople from Carinthia (state)